Last Melody is the third single album by South Korean group Everglow. It was released by Yuehua Entertainment on May 25, 2021, and consists of three tracks.

Background and release
On May 6, 2021, Yuehua Entertainment announced that Everglow would be releasing a single album in May 25. On May 17, the track listing was released. A day later, the teaser video was released. On May 21, the medley video was released. The album was released on May 25 together with the music video for lead single "First".

Commercial performance
Last Melody debuted and peaked at position 4 on South Korea's Gaon Album Chart in the chart issue dated May 23–29, 2021.

Promotion
Following the release of the album, the group performed lead single "First" on six music programs: Mnet's M Countdown on May 27, KBS2's Music Bank on May 28, MBC's Show! Music Core on May 29, SBS's Inkigayo on May 30, and SBS MTV's The Show on June 1 where they won the first place, and MBC's Show Champion on June 2.

Track listing

Accolades

Charts

Release history

References

2021 EPs
Everglow albums
Korean-language EPs